Reading list may refer to: 

 Reading list, a list of publications to be read, e.g., as part of the syllabus of an academic course
 Reading List, a Safari (web browser) bookmarking feature for saving links to webpages, with simple metadata for later reading, synchronized across devices